Uruguay Station or Uruguai Station may refer to:

Uruguay (Milan Metro), a metro station on the Milan Metro
Uruguay (Buenos Aires Underground), an underground station on Line B of the Buenos Aires Underground
Uruguay, an underground station on Line G (Buenos Aires Underground)
Uruguai Station, a metro station in Rio de Janeiro